Dagara may refer to the following:
 Dagara people, an African ethnic group
 Dagara language, their language
 Dagara, Baleswar, a village in India
 A district, or barangay, in Kabugao, Apayao, the Philippines